Edmund Seyfang Taylor (27 August 1853 – 19 April 1908), popularly known as "Walker Miles", was an early pioneer of rambling in the UK. He founded one of the predecessors of the modern-day Ramblers of Great Britain and wrote numerous walking guides.

Legacy 

Walker Miles was the founder of the Croydon Rambling Club and was also associated with the Forest Ramblers and the Commons and Footpaths Preservation Society.

In 1905, along with representatives from other London-based clubs, Walker founded the Federation of Rambling Clubs. This proved to be the first of many such organizations around the country which eventually joined together to form the National Council of Ramblers Federations. In 1935 this became the Ramblers Association of Great Britain.

Guidebooks 

Walker wrote 37 pocket-sized books of 'field-path rambles' and published them via his own printing company which he inherited from his father. The pocket-sized guides covered walks in the Surrey and Kent area and were known for their meticulous attention to detail, with each new guide containing several pages of updates and corrections to previous books. They are credited with saving many little-known footpaths and rights of way from falling into disuse and being lost forever.

Commemoration 

Walker is buried in the graveyard of St Nicholas' Church, Godstone. His grave is marked with a notable sarsen stone which was erected by the rambling clubs of London. He is also remembered with a viewpoint indicator on top of the Leith Hill Tower, Coldharbour, Surrey.

In April 2008, The Ramblers Association's Surrey Area clubs held a weekend of special walks to mark the centenary of his burial and to commemorate the "father of Surrey rambling". Ramblers Association Vice President David Sharp, who attended the commemoration, outlined the importance of Walker Miles' contribution, saying:

References

External links 
 The Ramblers
 Surrey Ramblers

Walkers of the United Kingdom
1853 births
1908 deaths